Creswick, Victoria is a town in Australia

Creswick may also refer to:

Places
 Creswick railway station in Victoria, Australia
 Electoral district of Creswick in Victoria, Australia
 Shire of Creswick, former local government area in Victoria, Australia
 Creswick Gap, gap near Creswick Peaks in Antarctica
 Creswick Peaks, group of mountains in Antarctica

People
 Alice Creswick (1889–1973), executive of the Australian Red Cross Society
 Benjamin Creswick (1853–1946), English sculptor
 Harry Creswick (1902–1988), British librarian
 Henry Creswick (1824–1892), Australian cricketer
 Nathaniel Creswick (1831–1917), founder of football club Sheffield FC
 Phil Creswick (born 1965), member of boy band Big Fun
 Thomas Creswick (1811–1869), English landscape painter
 William Creswick (1813–1888), English actor
 Creswick Jenkinson, Australian screenwriter